Not Your Ordinary Girl is the fourth studio album by Kyla. released by Poly East Records under EMI Philippines in 2004.

The album spawned five singles "Because Of You", "Human Nature", "If the Feeling Is Gone", "Not Your Ordinary Girl", and "Till They Take My Heart Away" all of which were #1 hit singles. The album also includes the song Buti Na Lang interpreted by Kyla penned by producer Jonathan Manalo and placed third prize at the 2003 Metro Pop Song Festival.

Track listing

Notes
 Human Nature (track 2) was originally done by Michael Jackson taken from the album Thriller (1982).
 Make Me Whole (track 4) was originally done by Amel Larrieux taken from the album Infinite Possibilities (2000).
 If The Feeling Is Gone (track 6) was originally done by Ella Mae Saison taken from the album Language Of Soul (1992).
 What More Can I Say (track 8) was originally done by Gary Valenciano taken from the album Moving Thoughts (1987).
 I'm All Yours (track 13) was originally done by Rachael Lampa taken from the album Kaleidoscope (2002).
 Buti Na Lang (track 14) was an official entry at the 2003 Metro Pop Song Festival.
 'Til They Take My Heart Away (track 10) was originally done by Clair Marlo taken from the album Let It Go (1989).

See also
 Kyla discography

References

2004 albums
Kyla albums
EMI Records albums
Tagalog-language albums